Eunidia hovorkai is a species of beetle in the family Cerambycidae. It was described by Téocchi, Jiroux and Sudre in 2004.

References

Eunidiini
Beetles described in 2004